Kjellgren Kaminsky Architecture is an architecture firm based in Göteborg, Sweden. It works with architecture in its broadest meaning ranging from furniture to city planning, from theory to practice. In 2007, it won the international architect competition for a new dancehall/restaurant in Falsterbo (southern part of Sweden), which was inaugurated in 2009. The project won the Skånes Arkitekturpris. In 2021, Fredrik Kjellgren left the office, which was later run by Joakim Kaminsky under the name Kaminsky Arkitektur.

Publications 
Ecological Architecture, Chris van Uffelen (ed.), Braun, 2009, p. 48-49
Desire, The shape of things to come, R. Klanten, S. Ehmann, A. Kupetz, S. Moreno, A. Mollard (ed.), Gestalten, 2008

Notes and references

Carlsson, David Worlds first passive museum David Report, Accessed April 10, 2008
Bright, Christopher Swedish Prefab Dwell, Accessed May 19, 2008
Passive Houses Tropolism, Accessed Mars 05, 2008
Pirate Chair Designerblog, Accessed Mars 24, 2008
Kjellgren Kaminsky设计Passive Houses Interior Design, Accessed April 7, 2008
  ArchDaily , September 24, 2011
 Arkitektur, November 3, 2011

External links 
 Kjellgren Kaminsky Architecture website
 Swedish Association of Architects website Hägring, the award winning proposal

Architecture firms of Sweden
Companies based in Gothenburg